Panther Lake is a lake located by Panther Lake, New York. Fish species present in the lake include pickerel, tiger muskie, brown bullhead, pumpkinseed sunfish, black crappie, largemouth bass, and smallmouth bass. The lake is private. No boat launch is available to the public.

References

Lakes of New York (state)
Lakes of Oswego County, New York